Open E, Open-E or open e may refer to:
 Open-E, Inc. Software Company
 Open E tuning for guitars
 Latin epsilon, a letter of the extended Latin alphabet which represents the open-mid front unrounded vowel

See also
 Open (disambiguation)
 E (disambiguation)